The Women's 800 metres event  at the 2005 European Athletics Indoor Championships was held on March 4–6.

Medalists

Results

Heats
First 2 of each heat (Q) and the next 4 fastest (q) qualified for the semifinals.

Semifinals
First 3 of each heat (Q) qualified directly for the final.

Final

References
Results

800 metres at the European Athletics Indoor Championships
800
2005 in women's athletics